Cruria is a genus of moths of the family Noctuidae.

Species
 Cruria donowani Boisduval, 1832
 Cruria epicharita Turner, 1911
 Cruria kochii Macleay, 1866
 Cruria latifascia Jordan, 1912
 Cruria synopla Turner, 1903
 Cruria tropica Lucas, 1891

References
 Cruria at Markku Savela's Lepidoptera and Some Other Life Forms
 Natural History Museum Lepidoptera genus database

Agaristinae